The 1994–95 Copa del Rey was the 93rd staging of the Copa del Rey.

The competition started on 28 September 1994 and concluded on 27 June 1995 with the Final, held at the Estadio Santiago Bernabéu in Madrid.

First round

Second round

Third round

Fourth round

Bracket

Round of 16

First leg

Second leg

Quarter-finals

First leg

Second leg

Semi-finals

First leg

Second leg

Final 

Resumed

Top goalscorers

References

External links 
 www.linguasport.com 
 BDFutbol 

Copa del Rey seasons
1994–95 in Spanish football cups